Cedar Creek Reservoir is a reservoir located in Henderson and Kaufman Counties, Texas (USA),  southeast of Dallas. It is built on Cedar Creek, which flows into the Trinity River. Floodwaters are discharged through a gated spillway into a discharge channel that connects to the Trinity River.

Description 
The lake has a drainage area over 1,000 square miles (2,600 km2). The Texas Parks and Wildlife Department maintains three islands, totalling 160 acres (65 ha), as a wildlife management area for aquatic birds. The lake is owned by the Tarrant Regional Water District, and supplies water to Fort Worth and other cities and water districts in Tarrant and Johnson Counties. Construction on the lake began in 1961, and was completed in 1965.

History 
Cedar Creek Lake is a fourth water source for Tarrant Regional Water District's water supply. When the lake gets over that point, gates from the spillway are opened, releasing water; 2005 and 2006 were dry years, sending the lake to a record low on December 12, 2006. This passed the old record of  low set on May 8, 1981. This was the first significant rainfall since April 2006. It was the big turning point for the drought in North Texas, as more rain continued through the month. By January 1, the lake was only a little over  low. Huge rainstorms throughout January brought the lake to only  low. A bit of a break came in February, as mainly snow and ice added to the lake rising. Lake Benbrook, Lake Worth, and Lake Arlington also filled up in these rains. Later on, Richland-Chambers Reservoir filled up all the way, then Eagle Mountain, and then on June 30, 2007, Lake Bridgeport was full for the first time since May 15, 2001, more than six years since the flood gates had been open. It was a milestone for Tarrant regional water district having all seven of their lakes full.

Settlements 
Towns on or near the lake include Kemp, Mabank, Gun Barrel City, Payne Springs, Enchanted Oaks, Eustace, Caney City, Malakoff, Star Harbor, Trinidad, Tool, and Seven Points. Its proximity to the Dallas-Fort Worth Metroplex makes it a popular weekend getaway.

Creeks and rivers 
Cedar Creek Reservoir was built on Cedar Creek, a tributary to the Trinity River. The dam is at the south end of the lake in the town of Malakoff. The spillway on the west side of the lake lets water into a canal to the Trinity River which is located in Tool, Texas. Other major creeks that contribute to the inflow are Caney Creek, Clear Creek, and King's Creek.

Fishing 
The predominant fish species of Cedar Creek Lake are blue catfish, channel catfish, flathead catfish, largemouth bass, white bass, hybrid striped bass, and crappie. The best fishing areas for largemouth bass are in the southern portion of the lake, where the water is clearer, especially the southern third of the lake in the large coves and inlets on Texas rig worms and top waters. Docks are a main place to catch the large bass. Always use Texas rigged worms, frogs, buzzbaits, and crankbaits. Jigs are a huge plus at the docks. Catfish can be found everywhere, with more blues than channels. Fishing is particularly good in the spring and into summer. Due to the many smaller streams, creeks, and run-offs flowing into the lake, running jug lines in the channels of the many coves using goldfish, shad, and small sunfish makes for very good blue catfish and flathead (yellow) catfish fishing grounds.

See also 

 List of dams and reservoirs in Texas
 Trinity River Authority

References

External links 

 
 
 Tarrant Regional Water District
 Cedar Creek Lake Community Website
 Cedar Creek Lake Online Community Website
 Cedar Creek Powerboat Association

Reservoirs in Texas
Protected areas of Henderson County, Texas
Protected areas of Kaufman County, Texas
Rivers of Henderson County, Texas
Rivers of Kaufman County, Texas